Farid Nabil Makari (24 October 1947 – 17 August 2022) was a Lebanese politician.

Early life and education 
Makari was born in Anfeh on 24 October 1947. He graduated from University of Texas at Austin in civil engineering and joined Oger Saudi and Oger International, companies founded by the former Lebanese prime minister, Rafik Hariri.

Career 
In 1992, Makari entered politics, winning the Eastern Orthodox parliamentary seat in the district of Koura. Makari was re-elected in 1996, 2000, 2005 and 2009. Between 1995–1996, Makari was appointed Information Minister in the Government of Rafik Hariri. On 25 September 1996 Prime Minister Hariri’s government issued a decree ordering the closure of Lebanon’s 150 privately owned radio stations and 50 TV stations. This followed Information Minister Farid Makari’s 17 September order banning the broadcast of news programs. Licences were to be issued to Future Television owned by Hariri, the Christian owned Lebanese Broadcasting Corporation International (LBCI), Murr Television (MTV) owned by the brother of Michel Murr the interior minister, and the National Broadcasting Network (NBN) being set up by Nabih Berri. The radio stations which were to be given licenses were Hariri’s Orient Radio, Berri’s NBN, and the Lebanese Forces’s Voice of Free Lebanon. It was estimated that the move would result in the loss of 5,000 jobs. In 2005 Makari established himself as one of the prominent figures in the Cedar Revolution following Hariri's assassination. In 2005, the Koura constituents elected Makari to Parliament for a fourth term as part of the majority 14 March bloc and he was elected as Deputy Speaker of Parliament, a position from where Makari has adopted and espoused many strong political stands.

Personal life 
Makari died on 17 August 2022, at the age of 74.

References

External links
 The Official Website

1947 births
2022 deaths
Greek Orthodox Christians from Lebanon
Cockrell School of Engineering alumni
University of Texas at Austin alumni
Lebanese civil engineers
Government ministers of Lebanon
Members of the Parliament of Lebanon
People from Koura District
Future Movement politicians